The Church of St. John the Baptist, Newport is a parish church in the Church of England located in Newport, Isle of Wight. It is a Grade II listed building, the only surviving building by the British architect Robert Gunter Wetten (1804–1868).

History
Construction started in 1835. The building, at the junction of St. John's Road and Terrace Road, was complete by 1837. It cost £3,600 and had 830 seats.

It was consecrated on 4 April 1837 by Charles Sumner, Bishop of Winchester.

Originally it was a daughter church within the Parish of Carisbrooke, and known as St John's Church, Carisbrooke. It became a parish church in its own right in 1896, by order of the Privy Council. It is now part of a joint parish with Sts Thomas Minster.

Organ
An organ was provided when the church opened in 1837, which was later replaced by a pipe organ by Bryceson Brothers dating from 1890. A specification of the organ can be found on the National Pipe Organ Register.

List of organists
 J.H.Mew  1836 – after 1842
 A.Wells  before 1882–1889
 Alexander S. L. Scadding 1890–1921 - 1921 - ????
 Dorothy M. Welby Prior 1921–1959 1949
 Horace Lower (acting) 1959
 Alfred Westley Faulkner 1959–1960
 Horace Lower (acting) 1960
 James Ludlow 1960–1962
 Horace Lower 1962–1980
 John Matthews (acting) 1980
 John Matthews 1980–present

References

Newport
Newport, Isle of Wight
Newport